Marlín is a village and municipality located in the province of Ávila, part of the autonomous community of Castile-Leon, Spain. It has approximately 38 inhabitants.

References

Municipalities in the Province of Ávila